Monoplex penniketi is a species of predatory sea snail, a marine gastropod mollusk in the family Cymatiidae.

Description
The length of the shell attains 35 mm.

Distribution
This marine species occurs off Oman.

References

External links
  https://www.biodiversitylibrary.org/page/58988686 

Cymatiidae
Gastropods described in 1998